Hans Wilhelm Schlegel (Überlingen, 3 August 1951) is a German physicist, a former ESA astronaut, and a veteran of two NASA Space Shuttle missions.

Early life and education

Schlegel, born and raised in Germany, graduated as an international exchange student from Lewis Central High School in Council Bluffs, Iowa and Hansa Gymnasium in Cologne before studying physics at RWTH Aachen University in his home country. After having received his university degree, he conducted research in semiconductor physics before being trained as an astronaut in the late 1980s by the German Aerospace Center (DLR). He flew as a DLR payload specialist in 1993 aboard Space Shuttle mission STS-55, which included the German-sponsored Spacelab D-2 research module.

ESA career

From 1995 to 1997, he trained as the backup crew member for the German-Russian Mir'97 mission, and afterwards received additional training in Russia to become qualified as a second board engineer for the Mir space station. In 1998, he became a member of the European Astronaut Corps.

Schlegel was a mission specialist on the STS-122 Space Shuttle mission. The mission was charged with carrying the Columbus laboratory into orbit and connecting it to the International Space Station.

Hans was to perform a spacewalk on the first EVA (EVA1) of STS-122, on Sunday, 10 February 2008, in preparation for attaching the Columbus laboratory to the ISS. The EVA was postponed until Monday 11 February 2008 due to an undisclosed medical issue allegedly affecting Schlegel. Stanley G. Love performed the spacewalk instead of Schlegel.  However, Schlegel did perform the second EVA on Wednesday 13 February 2008. During the spacewalk, he completed the replacement of the Nitrogen Tank Assembly on the P1 truss of the International Space Station, and installed trunnion covers on the Columbus module.

External links
 ESA profile page
 NASA Biography
 Spacefacts biography of Hans Schlegel

1951 births
Living people
German astronauts
RWTH Aachen University alumni
European amateur radio operators
Officers Crosses of the Order of Merit of the Federal Republic of Germany
Space Shuttle program astronauts
Spacewalkers